Lawrence County is located in the southwest portion of the U.S. state of Missouri, in the area of the Ozarks. As of the 2010 census, the population was 38,634. Its county seat is Mount Vernon. The county was organized in 1845 and named for James Lawrence, a naval officer from the War of 1812 known for his battle cry, "Don't give up the ship!"

A previous Lawrence County, established in 1815 with its county seat at what is now Davidsonville Historic State Park in Arkansas, covered much of what is now southern Missouri and the northern third of Arkansas. When the Arkansas Territory was created from Missouri Territory in 1819, some of that earlier county became organized as Lawrence County, Arkansas.

Just before that, in 1818, Missouri divided its part of the old Lawrence County into Wayne County and Madison County; with population increases, those counties were later divided into others, including the present Lawrence County.

Racial History
Following the Reconstruction era, southwestern Missouri became increasingly hostile to African Americans, and whites attacked blacks in Lawrence and other counties, seeking to expel them from the region. An African-American man was lynched in Verona, Missouri on January 26, 1894; his name was not recorded. On August 19, 1901, three men were lynched by a white mob in the county seat, Pierce City, in Lawrence County. The mob also burned down some black homes, and drove roughly 30 families, a total of 300 African Americans, out of the city altogether. Whites took over their properties and the African Americans were never compensated for losses.

As a result of such incidents, many African Americans left Southwest Missouri in the early 20th century. The extrajudicial murders were part of a pattern of discrimination, repeated violence and intimidation of African Americans in southwest Missouri from 1894 to 1909. Whites in Greene conducted a mass lynching of three African-Americans in 1906 in the courthouse square.

Geography

Adjacent counties
Dade County (north)
Greene County (northeast)
Christian County (southeast)
Stone County (southeast)
Barry County (south)
Newton County (southwest)
Jasper County (west)

Major highways
 Interstate 44
 U.S. Route 66 (1926–1985)
 Route 39
 Route 96
 Route 97
 Route 266

National protected area
Ozark Cavefish National Wildlife Refuge

Demographics

As of the census of 2000, there were 35,204 people, 13,568 households, and 9,728 families residing in the county. The population density was 57 people per square mile (22/km2). There were 14,789 housing units at an average density of 24 per square mile (9/km2). The racial makeup of the county was 95.68% White, 0.27% Black or African American, 0.76% Native American, 0.22% Asian, 0.02% Pacific Islander, 1.67% from other races, and 1.37% from two or more races. Approximately 3.39% of the population were Hispanic or Latino of any race.

There were 13,568 households, out of which 33.60% had children under the age of 18 living with them, 58.90% were married couples living together, 9.00% had a female householder with no husband present, and 28.30% were non-families. 24.50% of all households were made up of individuals, and 11.90% had someone living alone who was 65 years of age or older. The average household size was 2.55 and the average family size was 3.03.

In the county, the population was spread out, with 27.20% under the age of 18, 7.90% from 18 to 24, 26.90% from 25 to 44, 22.40% from 45 to 64, and 15.60% who were 65 years of age or older. The median age was 37 years. For every 100 females there were 97.00 males. For every 100 females age 18 and over, there were 92.10 males.

The median income for a household in the county was $31,239, and the median income for a family was $36,846. Males had a median income of $27,309 versus $18,990 for females. The per capita income for the county was $15,399. About 11.00% of families and 14.10% of the population were below the poverty line, including 19.50% of those under age 18 and 11.80% of those age 65 or over.

2020 Census

Education

Public schools
Aurora R-VIII School District – Aurora 
Pate Early Childhood Center (PK-02) 
Robinson Elementary School (03-04) 
Robinson Intermediate School (05-06) 
Aurora Junior High School (07-08) 
Aurora High School (09-12) 
Marionville R-IX School District – Marionville
Marionville Elementary School (PK-05) 
Marionville Middle School (06-08) 
Marionville High School (09-12) 
Miller R-II School District – Miller
Central Elementary School (K-06) 
Miller High School (07-12) 
Mt. Vernon R-V School District – Mt. Vernon 
Mt. Vernon Elementary School (PK-02) 
Mt. Vernon Intermediate School (03-05) 
Mt. Vernon Middle School (06-08) 
Mt. Vernon High School (09-12) 
Pierce City R-VI School District – Pierce City
Central Elementary School (PK-05) 
Pierce City Middle School (06-08) 
Pierce City High School (09-12) 
Verona R-VII School District – Verona
Verona Elementary School (PK-06) 
Verona High School (07-12)

Private schools
Aurora Christian Academy – Aurora (K-12) – Baptist (Special Education Emphasis)
Harvest Christian Academy – Aurora (K-12) – Nondenominational Christian 
Round Grove Christian Academy – Miller (PK-09) – Baptist 
Trinity Lutheran School – Freistatt (PK-08) – Lutheran 
St. Mary’s Catholic School – Pierce City (PK-08) – Roman Catholic

Public libraries
Barry-Lawrence Regional Library

Politics

Local
The Republican Party completely controls politics at the local level in Lawrence County. Republicans hold all elected positions in the county.

State

Lawrence County is divided into two legislative districts in the Missouri House of Representatives, both of which are held by Republicans.

District 157 — Mike Moon (R-Ash Grove). Consists of most of the entire county. 

District 158 — Scott Fitzpatrick (R-Shell Knob). Consists of a part of the southwest corner of the county, including about half of Pierce City.

All of Lawrence County is a part of Missouri's 29th District in the Missouri Senate and is currently represented by David Sater (R-Cassville.

Federal

All of Lawrence County is included in Missouri's 7th Congressional District and is currently represented by Billy Long (R-Springfield) in the U.S. House of Representatives.

Political culture

Missouri presidential preference primary (2008)

Voters in Lawrence County from both political parties supported candidates who finished in second place in the state at large and nationally. Former Governor Mike Huckabee (R-Arkansas) received more votes, a total of 2,628, than any candidate from either party in Lawrence County during the 2008 presidential primary.

Communities

Cities
Aurora
Marionville
Miller
Monett
Mount Vernon (county seat)
Pierce City
Stotts City
Verona

Villages
Freistatt
Halltown
Hoberg

Census-designated place
Chesapeake

Other unincorporated places

 Albatross
 Bowers Mill
 Clarkson
 Elliott
 Grays Point
 Heatonville
 Lawrenceburg
 Logan
 McKinley
 Minden
 Olinger
 Opal
 Orange
 Paris Springs Junction
 Phelps
 Plew
 Red Oak
 Rescue
 Round Grove
 Spencer
 Stinson

See also
 List of counties in Missouri
National Register of Historic Places listings in Lawrence County, Missouri

References

External links
 Digitized 1930 Plat Book of Lawrence County  from University of Missouri Division of Special Collections, Archives, and Rare Books
 https://www.webcitation.org/609AsaFfq?url=http://quickfacts.census.gov/qfd/states/29/29109.html

 
1845 establishments in Missouri
Populated places established in 1845